The Minnesota Senate, District 1, encompasses the far Northwestern part of Minnesota. It includes the entirety of Kittson County, Roseau County, Marshall County, Red Lake County, Polk County and Pennington County. It is currently served by Republican Mark Johnson.

List of senators

References 

Minnesota Senate districts
Pennington County, Minnesota
Red Lake County, Minnesota
Polk County, Minnesota
Kittson County, Minnesota
Roseau County, Minnesota
Marshall County, Minnesota